Milan Pavlović (born 2 January 1970) is a Bosnian actor and TV personality.

His first television role was in a short film called 10 Minutes in 2002, directed by Ahmed Imamović, however, Pavlović is mostly known for portraying the role of Dino Mehmeda Mujkić in popular Bosnian sitcom Lud, zbunjen, normalan from 2007 to 2009.

Filmography

Film

Television

References

External links

1970 births
Living people
Male actors from Sarajevo
21st-century Bosnia and Herzegovina male actors
Bosnia and Herzegovina male film actors
Bosnia and Herzegovina male television actors